Laurence Plazenet (born June 22, 1968) is a French novelist. She was born in Paris and studied at the Ecole Normale Supérieure. A literature PhD, she taught at Sorbonne, and studied at Princeton University. She has written three novels: 
 L’amour seul
 La Blessure et la soif 
 Disproportion de l’homme

She won the European Union Prize for Literature for L’amour seul.

References

1968 births
21st-century French novelists
Living people
French novelists
Writers from Paris